The following museums are located in Broward County, Florida.
African-American Research Library and Cultural Center, Fort Lauderdale
Bienes Museum of the Modern Book
Bonnet House Museum & Gardens
Coral Springs Museum of Art
Ely Educational Museum, Pompano Beach
Fort Lauderdale Antique Car Museum
Fort Lauderdale Fire and Safety Museum
Fort Lauderdale History Center
Holocaust Documentation & Education Center, Dania Beach, raising funds for a future South Florida Holocaust Museum
IGFA Fishing Hall of Fame and Museum, Dania Beach
International Swimming Hall of Fame museum
James D. and Alice Butler House, Deerfield Beach
Kester Cottages, Pompano Beach
Museum of Art Fort Lauderdale
Museum of Discovery and Science
Old Deerfield School, Deerfield Beach
Old Dillard Museum
Old Pompano Fire Station, Pompano Beach
Sample-McDougald House, Pompano Beach
Stonewall National Museum & Archives
Stranahan House, the oldest house in Broward County.
Naval Air Station Fort Lauderdale Museum, World War II, flight 19, and on the register of historic places.
World AIDS Museum and Educational Center, Wilton Manors'
Wiener Museum of Decorative Arts, Dania Beach

Defunct museum:
Afro-American Museum of Pompano Beach

Museums in Fort Lauderdale, Florida